Emil and the Detectives is a 1954 West German family adventure film directed by Robert A. Stemmle and starring Heli Finkenzeller, Wolfgang Lukschy and Kurt Meisel.

It is a remake of the 1931 film of the same name which was based on a 1929 novel by Erich Kästner. Unlike the earlier version which was set during the Great Depression, this film was made with Eastmancolor and portrays West Berlin during the economic miracle.

The film's sets were designed by the art directors Willi Herrmann and Heinrich Weidemann. It was shot at the Tempelhof Studios in Berlin and on location across the city.

Cast
 Peter Finkbeiner as Emil Tischbein - der Sohn
 Heli Finkenzeller as Seine Mutter Anna Tischbein
 Wolfgang Lukschy as Oberwachtmeister Jeschke
 Kurt Meisel as Herr Grundeis
 Ruth Nimbach as Anni Wandel
 Claudia Schäfer as Pony Hütchen - Emils Cousine
 Margarete Haagen as Die Grossmutter
 Camilla Spira as Emils Tante Martha Heimbold
 Hans Dieter Zeidler as Emils Onkel
 Lothar Scholz as Hotelpage
 Walter Gross as Ein Strassenbahnschaffner
 Ernst Waldow as Der Kurgast
 Gerd Frickhöffer as Der Festredner
 Marina Ried as Seine Frau
 Else Reval as Frau Wirth
 Jakob Tiedtke as Der Rektor
 Axel Monjé as Der Herr vom Kriminalamt
 Wolfgang Condrus as Gustav mit der Hupe
 Wolf-Eberhard Grasshoff as Der Professor
 Roland Kaiser as Der kleine Dienstag
 Hannes Hübner as Des fliegende Hirsch

References

Bibliography 
 Hake, Sabine. German National Cinema. Routledge, 2002.

External links 
 

1954 films
German children's adventure films
West German films
1950s German-language films
Films directed by Robert A. Stemmle
Films shot at Tempelhof Studios
Films shot in Berlin
Films set in Berlin
Films based on works by Erich Kästner
Films based on German novels
Films based on children's books
Remakes of German films
1950s children's adventure films
1950s German films